"1999" is a song by English singer and songwriter Charli XCX and Australian singer Troye Sivan, released as the lead single from the former's third studio album Charli on 5 October 2018. The single cover was inspired by the 1999 film The Matrix. It follows several singles released earlier in 2018 by Charli XCX and Sivan's 2018 album Bloom. The track reached number 13 on the UK Singles Chart dated 22 November 2018, becoming Charli XCX's tenth top 40 single and first top 15 single since 2015, as well as Sivan's fourth top 40 single and his first top 20 single.

A sequel to the track, "2099", was released as a promotional single in September 2019.

"1999" is playable in Just Dance Unlimited on Just Dance 2020.

Background and composition

Background
The song contains nostalgic lyrical references to the titular year along with a snare-heavy beat, "fuzzy sawtooth bass and sparking Eurodance keys". Sasha Geffen of Pitchfork stated that the track is "more concerned with the act of remembering than with the specifics of the year it calls up itself" and "fits alongside the rest of Charli XCX's sleek, forward-looking pop songs". The song also references Britney Spears' 1998 debut single, "...Baby One More Time".

Musical composition
The song is written in the key of B minor, with an allegro tempo of 124 BPM in  common time. Sivan's and Charli XCX's voices span between the notes B3 and F#5.

Artwork
The cover art references the 1999 film The Matrix, with Sivan dressed as Neo, wearing dark sunglasses, a black overcoat, and dyed black hair against a bright green background. Charli XCX, who is dressed as Trinity, flanks him. Billboard also noted its similarity to Aaliyah in the music video for her 2000 song "Try Again".

Promotion
Charli XCX and Sivan tweeted lyrics from "1999" addressed to each other on Twitter before both shared the cover art and title of the song.

Music video

The music video was released on 11 October 2018, and features Sivan and Charli XCX in various homages to 1990s pop culture, including the iMac G3 and Steve Jobs, Spice Girls, Britney Spears and Justin Timberlake, New Radicals, Eminem, the Nokia 3310, Rose McGowan and Marilyn Manson, the films Titanic, The Matrix, American Beauty, and The Blair Witch Project, the Dancing baby, the video game The Sims, and the music videos for the songs "Say You'll Be There", "Waterfalls", "Thinking of You (I Drive Myself Crazy)", and "I Want It That Way". For many of the homages in the music video the deepfake technology was used.

Track listing
Digital download
"1999" – 3:09

Digital download — Stripped version
"1999" (Stripped) – 3:21

Digital download — The Knocks Remix
"1999" (The Knocks Remix) – 3:41

Digital download – Remixes
"1999" (Alphalove remix) – 3:55
"1999" (Easyfun remix) – 3:12
"1999" (Michael Calfan remix) – 3:03
"1999" (R3hab remix) – 3:18
"1999" (Carta remix) – 2:52
"1999" (Super Cruel remix) – 2:51
"1999" (Young Franco remix) – 3:33
"1999" (Dipha Barus remix) – 2:28
"1999" (The Knocks remix) – 3:40

Charts

Weekly charts

Year-end charts

Certifications

Release history

Vengaboys version
In September 2021, Vengaboys released a cover version of the song, which was retitled "1999 (I Wanna Go Back)" and came with a deepfake-style video which saw the cover stars from various 1990s albums lip-syncing to the song and the band put into the Friends title sequence with the sofa and fountain. One of the "deepfakes" is superimposed on the single cover of Vengaboys' own "We're Going To Ibiza".

Notes

References

2018 songs
2018 singles
Charli XCX songs
Troye Sivan songs
Songs about nostalgia
Cultural depictions of Britney Spears
Songs written by Charli XCX
Songs written by Troye Sivan
Songs written by Leland (musician)
Songs written by Oscar Holter
Songs written by Noonie Bao
Asylum Records singles
Atlantic Records singles
Deepfakes
Male–female vocal duets
Vengaboys songs
2021 singles